Madugalle is a surname. Notable people with the surname include:

Milinda Madugalle, Sri Lankan actor and singer
Ranjan Madugalle (born 1959), Sri Lankan cricketer and referee

See also
 Madugalla

Sinhalese surnames